Bernard or Bernie Anderson imay refer to:

 Bernard Anderson (trumpeter) (1919–1997), American jazz trumpeter
 Bernard E. Anderson, American economist
 Bernie Anderson (American football), American football coach
 Bernie Anderson (footballer) (1941–2012), Australian rules footballer
 Bernie Anderson (teacher-legislator) (1942–2014), Nevada teacher turned Assemblyman
 Bernie Anderson Jr., silent film music composer, organist and orchestrator